Moby Dick Mountain is a  summit in British Columbia, Canada.

Description

Precipitation runoff from the mountain drains north to Battle Brook which is a tributary of the Incomappleux River, and south into Houston Creek which is a tributary of the Duncan River. Moby Dick Mountain is notable for its steep rise above local terrain and for its absolute elevation.

History

The landform is named after Moby Dick, the whale in Herman Melville's novel Moby-Dick which was published in 1851. The name was applied by mountaineer Douglas Anger and submitted in 1960 by Sam Silverstein of the Alpine Club of Canada. Anger imagined the mountain's features resembled a large white whale. It follows the Herman Melville-associated naming theme of the area established by the Sam Silverstein-Douglas Anger climbing party who made the first ascent of Moby Dick in 1959 along with Fenwick Riley. The mountain's toponym was officially adopted on November 1, 1963, by the Geographical Names Board of Canada.

Climate

Based on the Köppen climate classification, Moby Dick Mountain is located in a subarctic climate zone with cold, snowy winters, and mild summers. Winter temperatures can drop below −20 °C with wind chill factors below −30 °C. This climate supports the Pequod Glacier on the east slope of the peak, the Moby Dick Glacier on the south slope, an unnamed glacier on the north slope, and the Proteus Glacier to the west.

See also
Geography of British Columbia

References

External links
 Moby Dick Mountain: Weather forecast
 Moby Dick rock climbing: Mountainproject.com

Three-thousanders of British Columbia
Selkirk Mountains
Kootenay Land District
Moby-Dick